Campylidium is a genus of mosses belonging to the family Amblystegiaceae.

The genus was first described by Nils Conrad Kindberg.

The species of this genus are found in Europe.

Species:
 Campylidium sommerfeltii

References

Hypnales
Moss genera